Taos is a Tanoan language spoken by several hundred people in New Mexico, in the United States. The main description of its phonology was contributed by George L. Trager in a (pre-generative) structuralist framework. Earlier considerations of the phonetics-phonology were by John P. Harrington and Jaime de Angulo. Certain comments from a generative perspective are noted in a comparative work .

Segments

The two following sections detail phonetic information about Taos phonological segments (i.e., consonants and vowels), as well as their phonological patterning in morphophonemic alternations.

Consonants

 lists 27 consonants (25 native) for Taos, although in his later analysis he posited 18 consonants.

{| class="wikitable" style="text-align: center;"
! colspan="2"  rowspan="2" |
! rowspan="2" | Bilabial
! colspan="2" | Dental
! rowspan="2" | Alveolar
! rowspan="2" | Palatal
! colspan="2" | Velar
! rowspan="2" | Glottal
|- class="small" !
! central
! lateral
! plain
! labial
|-
! rowspan="4" | Stop
! voiced
|  ||  || || || ||  || ||
|-
! unaspirated
|  ||  || || ||  ||  ||  || 
|-
! aspirated
|  ||  || || || || || ||
|-
! ejective
|  ||  || || ||  ||  ||  ||
|-
! colspan="2" | Fricative
|  || ||  ||  || ||  ||  || 
|-
! colspan="2" | Nasal
|  ||  || || || || || ||
|-
! colspan="2" | Flap
| || || ||  || || || ||
|-
! colspan="2" | Approximant
| || ||  || ||  || ||  ||
|}

Words exemplifying Taos consonants are in the table below:

{| class="wikitable" style="line-height: 1.1em;"
! rowspan="2" | Consonant
! colspan="3" | Word-initial position
! colspan="3" | Word-medial position
|-
! IPA !! Trager !! Gloss !! IPA !! Trager !! Gloss
|-
!  
|  || bòyi’ína || 'valley'
|  || į́ęsiabą || 'he kicked'
|-
!  
|  || pá || 'he made'
|  || cùpána || 'judge' (noun)
|-
!  
|  || phùyu’úna || 'fly' (noun)
|  || kȕphúone || 'act of dropping'
|-
!  
|  || p’óna || 'moon'
|  || wȍp’ə́oti || 'he didn't lose it'
|-
!  
|  || mą́kuna || 'grandchild'
|  || kwę̀mų́na || 'carpenter's apron'
|-
!  
| colspan='3' style='text-align: center;' | –
|  || ȍdénemą || 'jaw'
|-
!  
|  || tȕculóna || 'hummingbird'
|  || cìatúną || 'legging'
|-
!  
|  || thį̀ę’éna || 'stomach'
|  || tə́otho || 'Taos pueblo'
|-
!  
|  || t’áwaną || 'wheel'
|  || mą̂t’emą || 'he hit it'
|-
!  
|  || ną̀lénemą || 'aspen'
|  || kə̀nénemą || 'cradle'
|-
!  
|  || łȉwéna || 'woman, wife'
|  || łùłi’ína || 'old man'
|-
!  
|  || lìlúna || 'chicken'
|  || kòléna || 'wolf'
|-
!  
|  || sə́onena || 'man, husband'
|  || mę̀sotu’úna || 'church'
|-
!  
|  || cùlo’óna || 'dog'
|  || p’ȍcíane || 'ice'
|-
!  
|  || c’óne || 'liver'
|  || mą̏c’élena || 'fingernail'
|-
!  
|  || yų́na || 'this'
|  || kàyúna || 'maternal aunt'
|-
!  
|  || gosulínene || 'gasoline'
|  || hí’ąngą || 'why, because'
|-
!  
|  || kána || 'mother'
|  || cìbi’kína || 'robin'
|-
!  
|  || k’ə́onemą || 'neck'
|  || p’ȍk’úowoną || 'fir, spruce'
|-
!  
|  || xónemą || 'arm'
|  || łòxóyna || 'lip'
|-
!  
|  || kwóna || 'axe'
|  || łǫ̀kwìawálmą || 'he was stronger'
|-
!  
|  || kw’àyána || 'magpie'
|  || p’ȍtukw’ilóna || 'mint'
|-
!  
|  || xwílena || 'bow'
|  || tùxwána || 'fox'
|-
!  
|  || wa̋mą || 'be, have'
|  || łòwatúną || 'chief's cane'
|-
!  
|  || íałona || 'willow'
|  || p’ȍ’ǫ́yona || 'spider'
|-
!  
|  || hǫ́luma || 'lung'
|  || pùohóna || 'ball'
|}

Consonant phonetics and allophony

 Voiceless stops  are very slightly aspirated.
 Aspirated stops  are strongly aspirated.
 The ejectives  are weakly glottalized.
 The dental consonants  are phonetically denti-alveolar.
 In some speakers,  may have an assimilated bilabial fricative : . This can also vary with a deleted stop closure. Thus,  has the following free variation: . Examples:

{|
|  || ('daughter') || > || 
|-
|  || ('glass') || > || 
|}

 The stops  are voiced  intervocalically. At the beginning of words, they only occur in loanwords (as in  'glass tumbler' from vaso and  'rooster' from gallo) where Trager describes them as "less voiced". Syllable-finally, they are voiceless, have no audible release, and have a long closure duration :

{|
|  || ('and') || > || 
|}

 There is a neutralization of the contrast between the labialized consonants  and their non-labial counterparts  before the (labial) high back vowels  where only phonetically labialized velars occur.

{|
|  || ('skunk') || > || 
|-
|  || ('sheep') || > || 
|-
|  || ('and then') || > || 
|}

 Fricative  has weak frication, unlike the stronger frication found in other languages (such as, the closely related Picuris language).
 Voiceless  is phonetically an affricate and usually post-alveolar . Taos  is somewhat more palatal than English ..</ref> However,  can freely vary with a more forward articulation ranging from post-alveolar to alveolar: . Some speakers tend to have more forward articulations  before the vowels  while ejective  is  before high vowels  and  elsewhere although there is some amount of free variation between these realizations. Examples:

{|
|  || ('he caught') || > || 
|-
|  || ('blue, green') || > || 
|-
|  || ('mouse') || > || 
|-
|  || ('shirt') || > || 
|-
|  || ('yeast') || > || 
|-
|  || ('doll') || > || 
|-
|  || ('coyote') || > || 
|-
|  || ('be new') || > || 
|-
|  || ('ankle') || > || 
|-
|  || ('bluejay') || > || 
|}

 Fricative  tends to have a post-alveolar allophone before high vowels  (especially the high front vowel ):

{|
|  || ('cow') || > || 
|-
|  || ('bluebird') || > || 
|}

 The flap  is a borrowed phoneme (< Spanish ) that occurs in loanwords from New Mexican Spanish that were borrowed relatively recently as in

{|
|  || ('ranch') || (from rancho)
|-
|  || ('pear') || (from pera)
|-
|  || ('vinegar') || (from vinagre)
|}

 The lateral liquid  is velarized  at the end of syllables:

{|
|  || ('be strong') || > || 
|}

 The labial glide  is labio-velar.
 The glides  are phonetically short high vowels  no closer than Taos high vowels, which are very close as well. When they occur after nasal vowels, they are nasalized: .

Consonant alternations

The stem-initial consonant in many verb stems has alternates (i.e. shows consonantal ablaut) between two different forms in what Trager calls the "basic" stem and the "stative" stem. The "basic" stem is used for the preterit active verb form while the "stative" stem is used for the resultative stative verb-forms and deverbal nouns.

{| class="wikitable" style="text-align: center; line-height: 1.2em;"
! Basic Initial !! Stative Initial !! Example
|-
|  || 
| style='text-align: left;' |  ('he lost it')  ('it is lost')
|-
|  || 
| style='text-align: left;' |  ('he helped him')  ('he was helped')
|-
|  || 
| style='text-align: left;' |  ('he tied it')  ('it is tied')
|-
|  || 
| style='text-align: left;' |  ('he ate it')  ('it was eaten')
|-
|  || 
| style='text-align: left;' |  ('he did')  ('it is done')
|-
|  || 
| style='text-align: left;' |  ('he took it')  ('it has been taken')
|-
|  || 
| style='text-align: left;' |  ('he brought it')  ('it has been brought')
|-
|  || 
| style='text-align: left;' |  ('he arrived')  ('arrival')
|-
|  || 
| style='text-align: left;' |  ('he took it off')  ('it has been taken off')
|-
|  || 
| style='text-align: left;' |  ('he walked')  ('walk' [noun])
|}

A different set of alternations are what Trager calls "internal" ablaut. The last consonant of the verb stem alternates between two different consonants in the basic stem form and the negative stem form.

{| class="wikitable" style="text-align: center; line-height: 1.2em;"
! Basic Consonant !! Negative Consonant !! Example
|-
|  || 
| style="text-align: left;" |  ('he kicked')  ('he didn't kick')
|-
|  || 
| style="text-align: left;" |  ('he lost it')  ('he didn't lose it')
|-
|  || 
| style="text-align: left;" |  ('he accepted')  ('he didn't accept')
|-
|  || 
| style="text-align: left;" |  ('he sat down')  ('he didn't sit down')
|-
|  || 
| style="text-align: left;" |  ('he hit')  ('he didn't hit')
|-
|  || 
| style="text-align: left;" |  ('he beat')  ('he didn't beat')
|}

Vowels

Monophthongs

Taos has six vowels with three contrastive vowel heights and two degrees of vowel backness.

{| class="IPA wikitable" style="text-align: center;"
|+ Phonemic vowels
! rowspan="2" |
! colspan="2" | Front
! colspan="2" | Back
|-
! oral
! nasal
! oral
! nasal
|-
! Close
| i || ĩ || u || ũ
|-
! Mid
| e || ẽ || ɤ
| style="background-color: lightGrey;" |
|-
! Open
| æ || æ̃ || ɑ || ɑ̃
|}

Five of the vowels have an oral-nasal contrast, which persists even before a nasal consonant coda (i.e. the syllables  and  contrast, where C = any consonant, V = any vowel, N = any nasal consonant).

Morphemes exemplifying Taos monophthongs are in the table below:

{| class="wikitable" style="line-height: 1.1em;"
! Vowel !! IPA !! Gloss
| style="background-color: lightGrey;" rowspan="7" |
! Vowel !! IPA !! Gloss
|-
!  
|  || 'what'
!  
|  || 'he met'
|-
!  
|  || 'he stopped'
!  
|  || 'who'
|-
!  
|  || (duoplural noun suffix)
!  
|  || 'hunt' (verb)
|-
!  
|  || 'you'
| style="background-color: lightGrey;" colspan="3" |
|-
!  
|  || 'he made'
!  
|  || 'he danced'
|-
!  
|  || 'yes'
!  
|  || 'blow'
|}

Monophthong phonetics and allophony

 Vowels  have lowered variants  in closed syllables and when unstressed.

{|
|  || ('to stand') || > ||  || (closed syllable)
|-
|  || ('weapon') || > ||  || (unstressed)
|-
|  || ('his-garment-around') || > ||  || (closed syllable)
|-
|  || ('ladder') || > ||  || (unstressed)
|}

 The vowel  has phonetic "inner rounding". The vowel  has a variant  with very narrow lip rounding before :

{|
|  || ('rain') || > || 
|-
|  || ('to love' [reflexive possessive]) || > || 
|-
|  || ('it was being burned') || > || 
|}

 The mid vowels  may be phonetically somewhat centralized. Front  is typically slightly centered  in both stressed and unstressed syllables. Back  ranges from back to central  and is  when unstressed. In contrast to the high back vowel , mid  is unrounded. Unlike the other vowels,  has no nasal counterpart. Examples:

{|
|  || ('eagles') || > || 
|-
|  || ('it was squeezed') || > || 
|-
|  || ('star') || > || 
|}

 The oral mid-front vowel  predominantly occurs in suffixes while nasalized  is relatively common in stems. Nasalized  is phonetically lower than its oral counterpart: :

{|
|  || ('act of cutting') || > || 
|}

 Oral  is phonetically front and is uncommon in syllables with primary stress. Examples:

{|
|  || ('he won') || > || 
|-
|  || ('soil') || > || 
|-
|  || ('his friends') || > || 
|-
|  || ('my house') || > || 
|}

 The vowel  has a slightly rounded variant  after labials  and also before  and syllable-final . Before syllable-final nasals  and the glide , this vowel is centralized:  (before ),  (before ). Nasalized  is phonetically slightly rounded and higher than its oral counterpart: . Examples:

{|
|  || ('pumpkin') || > || 
|-
|  || ('peach') || > || 
|-
|  || ('long time ago') || > || 
|-
|  || ('he ran') || > || 
|-
|  || ('skirt') || > || 
|-
|  || ('he didn't urinate') || > || 
|-
|  || ('coffee') || > || 
|-
|  || ('governor of pueblo') || > || 
|-
|  || ('he sees me') || > || 
|-
|  || ('colt') || > || 
|-
|  || ('camp" (noun) || > || 
|-
|  || ('person') || > || 
|-
|  || ('he found') || > || 
|}

The allophonic variation of the vowels detailed above are summarized in the following chart:

{| class="IPA wikitable" style="text-align: center;"
|+ Phonetic vowels
!
! Front
! Central
! Back
|-
! Close
|  =     = 
|
|  =     = 
|-
! Near-close
|  =     = 
|
|  =     = 
|-
! Close-mid
|
|  = 
|  =     = 
|-
! Open-mid
|  = 
|  =     = 
|  = 
|-
! Open
|  =     = 
|  = 
|  = 
|}

 Vowel length allophony:
 The duration of vowels varies according to stress. Vowels in syllables with primary stress are relatively long and somewhat shorter in syllables with secondary stress. Unstressed syllables have short vowels.
 The presence of a consonant coda also affects vowel length. Vowels are short in closed syllables (but not as short as unstressed syllables) and long in open syllables.
 There is also an interaction between tone and vowel length. Vowels with a mid tone are long while with a low tone are "pulsated". Trager mentions further interaction but does not report the details.

Diphthongs

In addition to these monophthongs, Taos has five (native) vowel clusters (i.e. diphthongs) that can function as syllable nuclei and are approximately the same duration as the single vowels:

 

Unlike diphthongs in several other languages, each component of the vowel cluster has an equal prominence and duration (i.e. there are no offglides or onglides). The cluster  is rare in general; the clusters  are uncommon in unstressed syllables. Additionally, the vowel cluster

 

is found in less-assimilated Spanish loanwords. Examples of the clusters are below:

{| class="wikitable" style="line-height: 1.1em;"
! Cluster !! IPA !! Gloss
|-
! 
|  || 'step-relation' (suffix)'step-daughter'
|-
! 
|  || 'race'
|-
! 
|  || 'paternal aunt'
|-
! 
|  || 'the wind did not blow'
|-
! 
|  || 'he is gathering it'
|-
! 
|  || 'frying pans'
|}

The phonetics of the vowel clusters vary in their length and also their quality according to stress, tone, and position syllable structure. The clusters  have vowel components of equal length in stressed closed syllables (either primary or medial stress) with mid tone. However, in unstressed syllables and in low-toned syllables (with either primary or medial stress) the first vowel in the cluster is more prominent; in high-toned syllables and in open syllables with primary stress and mid tone, the second vowel is more prominent. The nasal cluster  has equally prominent vowels in primary-stressed mid-toned syllables while in closed syllables and unstressed the second vowel is extremely short. The cluster  always has the first element more prominent than the second vowel.

For the quality differences, the vowel  in cluster  is raised toward . When short, the vowel  in cluster  is raised toward . These allophones are summarized in the table below:

{| class="wikitable" style="text-align: center;"
! Cluster !! Allophone !! Environment
|-
! rowspan="3" | 
| 
| style="text-align: left;" | stressed & mid tone & closed
|-
| 
| style="text-align: left;" | low tone or unstressed
|-
| 
| style="text-align: left;" | high tone or primary stress & mid tone & open
|-
! rowspan="3" | 
| 
| style="text-align: left;" | stressed & mid tone
|-
| 
| style="text-align: left;" | low tone or unstressed
|-
| 
| style="text-align: left;" | high tone or primary stress & mid tone & open
|-
! rowspan="2" | 
| 
| style="text-align: left;" | primary stress
|-
| 
| style="text-align: left;" | closed or unstressed
|-
! rowspan="3" | 
| 
| style="text-align: left;" | stressed & mid tone
|-
| 
| style="text-align: left;" | low tone or unstressed
|-
| 
| style="text-align: left;" | high tone or primary stress & mid tone & open
|-
! 
| 
| style="text-align: left;" | all environments
|}

The monophthongs can be followed by high front and high back offglides, but these are analyzed as glide consonants in a coda position. Trager notes that in these sequences the glides are not as prominent as the vowel nuclei but that the difference is not very marked, and, in fact,  describes these as diphthongs on par with Trager's "vowel clusters". The following vowel + glide sequences are reported in :

{| class="wikitable" style="text-align: center;"
! Vowel nucleus !!  offglide !!  offglide
| rowspan="7" |
! Vowel nucleus !!  offglide !!  offglide
|-
! 
| – || 
! 
|  || –
|-
! 
| – || 
! 
|  || –
|-
! 
| – || –
! 
|  || 
|-
! 
|  || –
! style="background-color: lightGrey;" |
| style="background-color: lightGrey;" |
| style="background-color: lightGrey;" |
|-
! 
|  || 
! 
|  || 
|-
! 
|  || 
! 
|  || –
|}

Reduplicative patterning

Noun stems that end in a vowel have a suffixation-reduplication process in absolute forms that attaches a glottal stop  and a reduplicant consisting of a reduplicated stem-final vowel to the noun stem (which is, then, followed by an inflectional suffix):

 STEM- + -- + -SUFFIX   (where V = a reduplicated vowel)

If the stem-final vowel is an oral vowel, the reduplicated vowel is exactly the same as the stem vowel:

{|
|  || ('bracelet') || (< )
|-
|  || ('bird') || (< )
|-
|  || ('cake') || (< )
|-
|  || ('fish') || (< )
|-
|  || ('skirts') || (< )
|-
|  || ('bat') || (< )
|}

However, if the stem-final vowel is nasal, the nasality is not copied in the reduplicant — that is, the nasal vowel will be reduplicated as that vowel's oral counterpart:

{|
|  || ('earth" (duoplural) || (< )
|-
|  || ('question') || (< )
|-
|  || ('youth') || (< )
|}

In stems that end in a vowel cluster, only the second vowel of the cluster is reduplicated:

{|
|  || ('corn (duoplural)') || (< )
|}

And a nasal cluster has a reduplicated and denasalized second vowel:

{|
|  || ('bed') || (< )
|}

Vowel deletion

Taos shares with other languages in the region (Pueblo linguistic area) an areal feature of vowel elision at the end of words. When a word ends in a final vowel, the vowel may be deleted resulting in a consonant final word. This is especially common with final  and occasionally with final .

For example, the 3rd person pronoun particle

  ('he, she, it, they')

is often phonetically

 

with syllable reduction and a resulting closed syllable. Other examples include

{|
|  || ('hundred') || > || 
|-
|  || ('thousand') || > || 
|-
|  || ('and') || > || 
|-
|  || ('why, because') || > || 
|}

In the words , the voiced stops become phonetically voiceless, unreleased, and have long durations when word-final in addition to the loss of the final vowel.

Prosody

Stress

Trager analyzes Taos as having three degrees of stress:

 primary
 secondary
 unstressed

Trager describes Taos stress in terms of loudness; however, he also notes in several places where stress has effects on vowel length and vowel quality.

All words must have a single primary stress. Polysyllabic words can, in addition to the syllable with primary stress, have syllables with secondary stress, unstressed syllables, or a combination of both unstressed and secondarily-stressed syllables.

 states that the primary and secondary stress levels are in complementary distribution in low-toned and high-toned syllables. However, his later analysis rejects this. 

When two morphemes both with a primary stress in each morpheme are concatenated together, the first primary stress in the leftmost morpheme becomes a secondary stress (while the rightmost morpheme retains the primary stress).

Tone

Taos has three tones:

 high (symbol: acute accent ´)
 mid (symbol: macron ¯)
 low (symbol: grave accent `)

The tonal system is however marginal. Trager describes the tones as being distinguished by pitch differences. The mid tone is by the most commonly occurring tone; high tone is limited to a few stems and suffixes; the low tone is relatively common in stem syllables. The high tone is described as "higher and sharper" than the mid tone while the low tone is "distinctly lower and drawling". Many words are distinguished solely by tonal differences as in the following minimal pairs which demonstrate the contrast between the mid tone and the low tone in stressed syllables:

{| cellspacing="4"
|  || ('pass by') ||   ||   ||  || ('one')
|-
|  || ('suck') ||   ||   ||  || ('it is real')
|}

There is no tonal contrast in unstressed syllables, which have only phonetic mid tones.

 initially found the stress level to be predictable in syllables with high and low tones; however,  finds this to be in error with the addition of newly collected data and a different theoretical outlook. (See stress section above.)

In his final historical notes,  suggests that in proto-Taos (or in proto-Tiwa) there may originally have been only a stress system and a contrast of vowel length which later developed into the present tonal-stress system and lost the vowel length contrasts.

Syllables and phonotactics

The simplest syllable in Taos consists of a single consonant in the onset (i.e. beginning consonant) followed by a single vowel nucleus, i.e. a CV syllable. An onset and nucleus are obligatory in every syllable. Complex onsets consisting of a two-consonant cluster (CC) are found only in loanwords borrowed from New Mexican Spanish. The nucleus can have optionally two vowels in vowel clusters (V or VV). The syllable coda (i.e. the final consonants) is optional and can consist of up to two consonants (C or CC). In other words, the following are possible syllable types in Taos: CV, CVV, CVC, CVVC, CVCC (and in loanwords also: CCV, CCVV, CCVC, CCVVC, CCVCC, CCVVCC). This can be succinctly represented in the following (where optional segments are enclosed in parentheses):

  C1 (C2)V1(V2)(C3)(C4<) + Tone

Additionally, every syllable has a tone associated with it. The number of possible syllables occurring in Taos is greatly limited by a number of phonotactic constraints.

A further point concerns Trager's analysis of Taos coda syllables: CC clusters occurring in codas are only possible as a result of vowel elision, which is often apocope. For example,  ('why') has a CV.CVC.CV syllable structure, but after the elision of the final  the resulting  has a CV.CVCC structure with a CC cluster in the coda of the last syllable.

Onsets

A single onset C1 can be filled by any Taos consonant (except the borrowed ) — that is,  are possible onsets. The onset , and the onsets  word-initially, are only found in Spanish borrowings.

{| class="wikitable" style="text-align: center;"
!
! colspan="5" style="line-height: 1em;" | C2
|-
!  C1 
!   
!   
|-
! 
|  || 
|-
! 
|  || –
|-
! 
|  || 
|}

Of the onsets,  can only occur as onsets (and not as codas).

Rimes

Within the syllable rime, any single Taos vowel —  — may occur in the nucleus. In complex nuclei consisting of vowel clusters, the following combinations are possible:

{| class="wikitable" style="text-align: center;"
|+ Vowel nucleus clusters
|-
!
! colspan="4" | Final component
|-
! style="line-height: 1em;" | Initialcomponent
!  !!  !!  !! 
|-
! 
|  || – ||  || –
|-
! 
| – ||  || – || –
|-
! 
| style="color: darkRed;" | † || – || – || 
|-
! 
| – || – || – || 
|}
 † - only in loanwords

The  cluster was found only in a single word  ('frying pan' from hypothetical Spanish *puela probably from French poêle).

A subset of Taos consonants consisting of voiced stops and sonorants —  — can occur in coda C4 position. There is a restriction that high vowels cannot be followed by a homorganic glide (i.e.,  do not occur). Not all VC combinations are attested. The attested sequences of V + glide are listed in the vowel diphthong section above. Additionally,  may appear in coda position in loanwords.

In complex two-consonant C3C4 codas,  states that the final consonant C4 can consist of a voiced stop  and be preceded by a consonant C3 consisting of a non-liquid sonorant . However,  states that the following are the only attested coda clusters:

 

Trager does not discuss the combinatory possibilities between segments and tones, although he does for stress and tone.

Loanword phonology

 indicates the type of phonetic/phonological changes that New Mexican Spanish loanwords undergo when being adapted to the Taos language. Different degrees of nativization occur in Spanish loanwords: earlier borrowings have greater differences while later borrowings (borrowed by speakers who are probably increasingly bilingual) have much greater similarity with the Spanish forms. The chart below lists some of the correspondences. The inflected nouns in the table are in the absolute singular form with the inflectional suffix and any reduplicant separated from the initial noun stem with hyphens.

{| class="wikitable" style="line-height: 1.1em;"
! rowspan="3" | New Mexican Spanishphoneme(s)
! rowspan="3" | Taos phoneme(s)
! colspan="3" | Example
|-
! colspan="2" | Taos
! rowspan="2" | Spanish
|- style="font-size: small;"
! word
! gloss
|-
|   (initial)
|  ||  || 'pocket' || < bolsa
|-
|   (intervocalic)
|  ||  || 'Thursday' || < jueves
|-
|   (initial)
|  ||  || 'week' || < domingo
|-
| rowspan="2" |   (intervocalic)
|  ||  || 'Saturday' || < sábado
|-
|  (after Taos ) ||  || 'fork' || < tenedor
|-
|  
|  ||  || 'one's child's godmother' || < comadre
|-
| 
|  ||  || 'pin' || < fistol
|-
| rowspan="2" |  
|  (initial) ||  || 'rug' || < jerga
|-
|  (intervocalic) ||  || 'the mother Virgin' || < virgen
|-
| 
|  ||  || 'Thursday' || < jueves
|-
|  
|  ||  || 'bed spring' || < sopanda
|-
|  
|  ||  || 'week' || < domingo
|-
| 
|  ||  || 'canyon' || < cañón
|-
| 
|  ||  || 'king' || < rey
|-
| 
|  ||  || 'donkey' || < burro
|-
|  
|  ||  || 'hammer' || < martillo
|-
|   (before V)
|  ||  || 'mare' || < yegua
|-
|  
|  ||  || 'Friday' || < viernes
|-
|  
|  ||  || 'Monday' || < lunes
|-
|   (before V)
|  ||  || 'mare' || < yegua
|-
|   (stressed)
|  ||  || 'garden' || < huerta
|-
|   (unstressed)
|  ||  || 'Wednesday' || < miércoles
|-
| 
|  ||  || 'bull' || < toro
|-
|  
|  ||  || 'pocket' || < bolsa
|}

Although NM Spanish  is usually borrowed as Taos , it is nativized as  when it precedes the Taos glide , which is the nativization of NM Spanish  in the cluster  ( > Taos ).

The other NM Spanish phonemes are nativized as similar phonemes in Taos:
NM Spanish  > Taos ,
NM Spanish  > Taos ,
NM Spanish  > Taos  (but see above for NM Spanish sequence ),
NM Spanish  > Taos ,
NM Spanish  > Taos ,
NM Spanish  > Taos ,
NM Spanish  > Taos ,
NM Spanish  > Taos .

See also

 Taos language

Notes

Bibliography

 
 
 
 
 
 
 
 
 
 
 
 

Taos language
Native American phonologies